Park Da-sol (born 21 January 1996) is a South Korean judoka. She won the silver medal in the women's 52 kg event at the 2018 Asian Games held in Jakarta, Indonesia. In 2021, she competed in the women's 52 kg event at the 2020 Summer Olympics in Tokyo, Japan.

In 2019, she won the silver medal in the women's 52 kg event at the Summer Universiade held in Naples, Italy. In that same year, she competed in the women's 52 kg event at the 2019 World Judo Championships held in Tokyo, Japan.

She also competed in the women's 52 kg event at the 2021 Judo World Masters held in Doha, Qatar. A few months later, she won the gold medal in her event at the 2021 Asian-Pacific Judo Championships held in Bishkek, Kyrgyzstan.

References

External links
 

Living people
1996 births
Place of birth missing (living people)
South Korean female judoka
Judoka at the 2018 Asian Games
Asian Games silver medalists for South Korea
Asian Games medalists in judo
Medalists at the 2018 Asian Games
Universiade medalists in judo
Universiade silver medalists for South Korea
Medalists at the 2019 Summer Universiade
Judoka at the 2020 Summer Olympics
Olympic judoka of South Korea
21st-century South Korean women